State Highway 66 (abbreviated SH-66) is a  state highway in the U.S. state of Oklahoma, beginning at U.S. Highway 81 in El Reno and ending at U.S. Highway 60 near White Oak. The highway was designated in 1985 as a replacement for the decommissioned US 66. Although most of the highway follows Historic Route 66, the highway follows US 66's final alignment, joining Interstate 44 through Tulsa and Oklahoma City, while older versions of the route follow various city streets through both cities.

The highway has retained its importance for most of its length due to its paralleling Interstate 44 which between Missouri and Oklahoma City (except in the cities of Tulsa and Oklahoma City) is a toll road.

SH-66 currently has one spur route, designated SH-66B, in Wellston.

Route description

Western terminus and Oklahoma City area

State Highway 66 begins at Business I-40 in El Reno (another old Route 66 segment), concurrent at this point with US-81. From this intersection, the highway heads due east. The highway briefly passes through a rural area after leaving El Reno, before transitioning into the Oklahoma City suburb of Yukon. In Yukon, the route runs along Main Street, and has a short concurrency with SH-4. SH-66 continues east, passing into Oklahoma City, where it becomes N.W. 39th Expressway. SH-66 has an interchange with the Kilpatrick Turnpike on the far west edge of the city. The highway passes just to the north of Lake Overholser. Near where the road crosses over the North Canadian River, the inlet to the lake, it crosses from Canadian County into Oklahoma County.

N.W. 39th Expressway, still carrying SH-66, forms the main street of both Bethany and Warr Acres, two enclave suburbs of Oklahoma City. The street passes just to the south of Wiley Post Airport and provides access to Southern Nazarene University. After leaving Warr Acres, the highway re-enters Oklahoma City. SH-66 leaves N.W. 39th Expressway at an interchange with I-44 and SH-3/SH-74 (the Lake Hefner Parkway). SH-66 begins a concurrency with eastbound I-44, and for the remainder of its length, it will stay close to the interstate.

SH-66 is unsigned through its time on the Oklahoma City freeway system. I-44, while concurrent with SH-66, runs along the north side of Oklahoma City, passing just south of Penn Square Mall, and meets Interstate 235 at a cloverleaf interchange at its northern terminus (north of the interchange, US-77 continues on as a freeway, the Broadway Extension). I-44 and SH-66 begin a concurrency with I-35 near Remington Park. The two interstates and the state highway head north through the northeast part of the city. At Hefner Road, the routes pass near the Frontier City amusement park. The highways then encounter an interchange which is the eastern terminus of the Kilpatrick Turnpike. This interchange is also where I-44 splits off to form the Turner Turnpike.

I-35 and SH-66 leave Oklahoma City and enter the suburb of Edmond. On the north side of town, SH-66 exits the interstate, while US-77 joins it. SH-66 continues east out of town, providing access to Arcadia Lake. The highway then passes through the town of Arcadia, home of the Round Barn, a Route 66 landmark. The highway then serves Luther before exiting Oklahoma County.

Lincoln and Creek Counties
On the west side of Lincoln County, SH-66 produces a business loop to Wellston, SH-66B (below). Just beyond this junction, SH-66 serves as the northern terminus of SH-102. The highway continues east, meeting up again with SH-66B on the east side of Wellston. Near this junction, SH-66 has an interchange with the Turner Turnpike (still carrying I-44). The route continues to parallel the turnpike as it comes to an intersection with US-177. East of this junction, SH-66 passes through the town of Warwick, where it crosses the Deep Fork of the Canadian River.

On the southwest side of Chandler, the county seat of Lincoln County, the route is joined by SH-18. The two routes turn north, passing through the core of the downtown area. On the north side of downtown, SH-66 splits off to the east.  east of Chandler, the highway passes through the town of Davenport. The route next encounters Stroud, where SH-66 intersects State Highway 99 and US-377, which may serve as the northern terminus of US-377.

East of Stroud, SH-66 passes into Creek County. The route next passes through Bristow, where it has a brief concurrency with SH-16 and begins a more lengthy one with SH-48. SH-48/66 exit Bristow to the north, with an interchange where they cross the Turner Turnpike. Near unincorporated Bellvue, SH-66 splits away from SH-48 and turns back to the northeast. The highway crosses the Turner Turnpike again (with no interchange this time), then runs through Kellyville.  northeast of Kellyville, the highway begins a concurrency with SH-33. SH-33 and SH-66 will remain signed together as they enter the Tulsa metropolitan area.

Tulsa area
SH-33/66 next enter Sapulpa, the county seat of Creek County and a suburb of Tulsa. In Sapulpa, the two highways serve as the western terminus of SH-117. They then come to the intersection of Dewey Avenue and Main Street in downtown Sapulpa, where SH-33 ends. This intersection also serves as the southern terminus of SH-97. SH-66 continues east through the intersection, joined by US-75 ALT. The two highways intersect SH-117A at its northern terminus, and turn left to continue its alignment. US-75 ALT/SH-66 parallel the Turner Turnpike within sight distance for the remainder of their journey in Creek County. Near the Creek–Tulsa County line, the Turner Turnpike ends, and SH-66 merges onto the now toll-free I-44. US-75 ALT ends at the merge.

I-44/SH-66 cut diagonally through the city of Tulsa. In West Tulsa, Interstate 244 branches off to serve the downtown area. I-44/SH-66 follow the Skelly Drive through midtown. The highways interchange with the Okmulgee Beeline, the US-75 freeway before crossing the Arkansas River. The next freeway interchange is with the Broken Arrow Expressway, carrying US-64 and SH-51, followed by the Mingo Valley Expressway, carrying US-169 I-244 then merges with I-44 at its eastern terminus. I-44/SH-66 cross into Rogers County and the suburb of Catoosa, serving as the southern terminus of SH-167. SH-66 then splits off from I-44, initially following an old alignment of the Interstate where it transitioned into the Will Rogers Turnpike. SH-66 then downgrades to an expressway as it passes through Catoosa, home of the Blue Whale. Northeast of Catoosa, near Verdigris, SH-66 intersects SH-266 at its eastern terminus.

Northeast Oklahoma
The next town that SH-66 serves after leaving the Tulsa area is Claremore, seat of Rogers County. In Claremore, SH-66 has brief concurrencies with SH-20 and SH-88. The highway continues northeast through Rogers County, bypassing Sequoyah to the west and serving as the western terminus of SH-28A in Foyil. The route then crosses into Craig County, where it serves the unincorporated place of White Oak. The SH-66 designation then comes to an end at US-60, which Route 66 historically followed into Vinita.

History
The present-day SH-66 was established to fill the void left when US 66 was decommissioned through Oklahoma in the early 1980s. SH-66 was designated as its replacement from El Reno to White Oak on April 1, 1985. The remainder of US 66 in Oklahoma was overlapped by other highways, principally I-40 and US-69, so the SH-66 designation was not applied to these sections of highway.

On July 1, 1991, SH-66 was realigned in the vicinity of Luther. No further changes to the SH-66 designation have occurred since that time. Planned improvements by the Oklahoma Department of Transportation include reconstruction and widening of SH-66 from two to four lanes from Edmond to the Lincoln County line.

As part of a project to widen I-235 and US-77 to accommodate the increase amount of traffic, its interchange with I-44/SH-66 was reconstructed from a cloverleaf interchange to a four-level interchange that eliminated two cloverleaf ramps. The other two cloverleafs were widened and reconstructed and two new flyover ramps were added. The four-level interchange is the first of its kind in Oklahoma. The $105 million project lasted three years and was opened on March 3, 2022. An additional $16 million is being provided to reconstruct the I-44 to US-77 ramp and provide a direct connection to North Lincoln Boulevard. The project is expected to be started in 2023.

SH-66B

While US 66 was still active, the SH-66 designation was given to a loop route through Wellston. This incarnation of SH-66 effectively served as a Wellston business loop for US 66. This route was first established on June 26, 1934.

Junction list

See also
 U.S. Route 66
 U.S. Route 66 in Oklahoma
K-66

References

External links

SH-66 at OKHighways

066
Transportation in Oklahoma City
Transportation in Canadian County, Oklahoma
Transportation in Oklahoma County, Oklahoma
Transportation in Lincoln County, Oklahoma
Transportation in Creek County, Oklahoma
Transportation in Tulsa County, Oklahoma
Transportation in Rogers County, Oklahoma
Transportation in Craig County, Oklahoma
U.S. Route 66 in Oklahoma